The Battle of Tarlow took place on June 30 – July 2, 1915, near the town of Tarlow, which at that time belonged to Russian-controlled Congress Poland. 1st Brigade, Polish Legions (part of the Austro-Hungarian Army), commanded by Józef Piłsudski, clashed with troops of the Imperial Russian Army.

In late June 1915, the 1st Brigade reached the village of Wolka Tarlowska, and tried to capture a bridge over the Vistula river, defended by Russian soldiers. The so-called Tarlow Redoubt was a fortified position of the Russians, located on a hill. Both sides suffered heavy losses, especially 1st Battalion of 1st Legions Infantry Regiment, commanded by Major Edward Rydz-Śmigły. Soldiers were buried in mass graves: after World War I, all bodies were moved to a parish cemetery, where a military quarter was created. In July 1929, local community of Tarlow funded a monument dedicated to the soldiers of the Legions.

The Battle of Tarlow is commemorated on the Tomb of the Unknown Soldier, Warsaw, with the inscription "TARLOW 30 VI – 2 VII 1915". The inscription was removed after 1945 by Communist authorities, to return in 1990.

Sources 
 Mieczysław Wrzosek, Polski czyn zbrojny podczas pierwszej wojny światowej 1914–1918, Państwowe Wydawnictwo "Wiedza Powszechna", Warszawa 1990

Tarłow
Tarłow
Tarłów